Edgar Fripp Mausoleum, St. Helena Island Parish Church is a historic mausoleum in Frogmore, South Carolina.

The Egyptian Revival mausoleum was built in 1852 and added to the National Register of Historic Places in 1988.

References

External links

 

Cemeteries on the National Register of Historic Places in South Carolina
Buildings and structures in Beaufort County, South Carolina
National Register of Historic Places in Beaufort County, South Carolina
1852 establishments in South Carolina
19th-century churches in the United States